Ludewala is a village in the Punjab of Pakistan.

References

Villages in Punjab, Pakistan

 Ludewala railway station